Burnaby Heights, often referred to as The Heights, is a residential neighbourhood in North Burnaby between Boundary Road to the west, Gamma Avenue to the east and bounded by Hastings Street to the south. Its northern edge facing the North Shore Mountains comes down rather steeply to the shores of Burrard Inlet.

Many community events, such as Hats Off Day, Halloween on the Heights and Light up the Heights are held annually.

Heritage homes 
Burnaby Heights has a significant number of heritage houses.

Christmas on the Heights 

It has become an annual tradition to light up the local stretch of Hastings Street during the Christmas season, which certainly makes it more attractive for shoppers and commuters in this dark time of year. The lights are installed and maintained by the City of Burnaby and light up the heights from November to March each year.

Traffic Issues 
In February 2009, in response to the petitions of various Burnaby heights residents, Burnaby City Council initiated a process to review the traffic issues in the Burnaby Heights neighbourhood.

References

Neighbourhoods in Burnaby